Kjellsby is a Norwegian surname. Notable people with the surname include:

Erling Kjellsby (1901–1976), Norwegian organist and composer
Jorunn Kjellsby (born 1944), Norwegian actress

Norwegian-language surnames